Garwood Point is a point marking the northern extremity of Gurnon Peninsula, a northeast arm of Bear Peninsula, on the Walgreen Coast of Marie Byrd Land, Antarctica. It was mapped by the United States Geological Survey from aerial photographs taken by U.S. Navy Operation Highjump in 1947, and was named by the Advisory Committee on Antarctic Names after James W. Garwood, a U.S. Navy metalsmith, who was crew chief at Williams Field, McMurdo Sound, and Christchurch, New Zealand, and maintenance shop supervisor in eight Operation Deep Freeze deployments.

References

Headlands of Marie Byrd Land